Mario Burić (born 25 October 1991), is a Croatian professional footballer who plays for second tier-side Jarun Zagfreb as a defender.

Club career
Burić played in the Austrian Regionalliga and made his professional debut for ViOn Zlaté Moravce against Slovan Bratislava on 19 July 2015.

Career statistics

Club

References

External links
 Futbalnet profile
 Fortuna Liga profile
 

1991 births
Living people
Sportspeople from Makarska
Association football defenders
Croatian footballers
HNK Zmaj Makarska players
NK Lučko players
LASK players
Union St. Florian players
FC ViOn Zlaté Moravce players
NK Slaven Belupo players
NK Lokomotiva Zagreb players
AS Béziers (2007) players
NK Rudeš players
NK Hrvatski Dragovoljac players
Enosis Neon Paralimni FC players
Croatian Football League players
First Football League (Croatia) players
Austrian Regionalliga players
Slovak Super Liga players
Championnat National players
Championnat National 2 players
Cypriot Second Division players
Croatian expatriate footballers
Expatriate footballers in Austria
Croatian expatriate sportspeople in Austria
Expatriate footballers in Slovakia
Croatian expatriate sportspeople in Slovakia
Expatriate footballers in France
Croatian expatriate sportspeople in France
Expatriate footballers in Cyprus
Croatian expatriate sportspeople in Cyprus